Big Brother is a United States reality television series based on the Dutch television series of the same name created by John de Mol in 1997. The series premiered on July 5, 2000. The series follows a group of contestants, known as HouseGuests, who live together in a custom–built home under constant surveillance. The HouseGuests are completely isolated from the outside world and generally have no communication from the outside world. In the first season, HouseGuests would nominate two of their fellow HouseGuests. The two HouseGuests with the most votes would be "marked for banishment" and the public then voted on whom to "banish" from the house. When three HouseGuests remained, the public voted on the winner. Despite an initial successful start, ratings and critical reaction continued to grow increasingly negative. This led to the second season being a revamp of the show featuring a more competition–based challenge. Starting with the second season, HouseGuests compete in a series of competitions to win power and safety, they then vote to "evict" one of their own until there are only two HouseGuests remaining. In finale episodes, previous HouseGuests vote on who they think they should win the game, with the HouseGuest who receives the most votes being declared the winner and receiving the grand prize.

CBS announced on May 20, that the 21st season was set to premiere on June 25, 2019. On September 5, 2019, it was announced that the series had been renewed through its 22nd season. The 22nd season premiered on August 5, 2020.

Series overview

List of episodes

Seasons 1–11 (2000–2009)

Seasons 12–21 (2010–2019)

Seasons 22–present (2020–present)

See also 
 List of Celebrity Big Brother (American TV series) episodes, a list of the United States version of Celebrity Big Brother episodes

References